The Indian Super League Emerging Player of the League is an annual association football award presented to the best young player in the Indian Super League each season.

The Indian Super League was founded in 2013, eight teams competed in the 2014 inaugural season. It became the joint top-tier of Indian football league system by 2017–18 season and is the top-tier since 2022–23 season. The first Emerging Player of the League was awarded to Sandesh Jhingan of Kerala Blasters in 2014.

Winners

Awards won by club

See also
 Indian Super League
 Indian Super League Golden Boot
 Indian Super League Hero of the League
 Indian Super League Golden Glove
 Indian Super League Winning Pass of the League

References

External links
 Indian Super League website

Emerging
Awards established in 2014
2014 establishments in India
Annual events in India